Hulings is an American surname. Notable people with the surname include:

Clark Hulings (1922–2011), American painter
Ryan Hulings (born 1991), American soccer player 
Willis James Hulings (1850–1924), American politician

See also
Huling (disambiguation)

Surnames of North American origin